Gogi Nask'idashvili (born 16 August 1947) is a Soviet retired slalom canoeist who competed in the early 1970s. He finished 31st in the K-1 event at the 1972 Summer Olympics in Munich.

References

1947 births
Canoeists at the 1972 Summer Olympics
Living people
Olympic canoeists of the Soviet Union
Soviet male canoeists
Russian male canoeists